Mitchell Robert Thompson (born 12 November 2001) is an Irish cricketer. In June 2019, Thompson was selected to play for the Ireland under-19 cricket team in the 2020 Under-19 Cricket World Cup qualification tournament. In Ireland's final match, against France, Thompson took a five-wicket haul, finishing with figures of 5/17 from 9.4 overs. He finished as the leading wicket-taker for Ireland, with thirteen dismissals.

In February 2021, Thompson was named as one of the players to join the Cricket Ireland Academy ahead of the 2021 season. Thompson, who had previously played cricket in Australia and South Africa, made his Twenty20 debut on 20 June 2021, for Munster Reds in the 2021 Inter-Provincial Trophy. He made his List A debut on 30 June 2021, for Munster Reds in the 2021 Inter-Provincial Cup.

References

External links
 

2001 births
Living people
Irish cricketers
Cricketers from Dublin (city)
Munster Reds cricketers
Leinster Lightning cricketers